Class S9 is a type of diesel multiple unit train operated by Sri Lanka's state run rail operator Sri Lanka Railways.

History
S9 DMU was introduced to Sri Lanka in year 2000. This was built by China South Locomotive & Rolling Stock Corporation and this was the first Diesel-Electric multiple unit to run on Sri Lanka rail.

Specifications
One S9 train-set consists of four Third Class(TC) passenger carriages, 1 Driving Trailer and one Power car with passenger seating. So this one is also capable of higher passenger capacity.

Operation
These DMUs are operated on Sri Lanka's Main Line (Up to Rambukkana), Coastal Line, Puttlam Line and Northern Line and not operated in Kelani Valley Line.

Gallery

See also
Diesel locomotives of Sri Lanka

References

External links 
Sri Lanka Railways Official Site

Train-related introductions in 2000
CRRC multiple units